Patrick Harrington may refer to:

 Patrick Harrington (bishop) (1939), Kenyan Bishop-emeritus of the Diocese of Lodwar in Kenya
 Patrick Harrington (barrister) (1950), Welsh barrister and Queen's Counsel
 Patrick Harrington (activist) (1964), English nationalist political activist
 Patrick L. Harrington, member of the Michigan House of Representatives.

See also
 Pat Harrington (disambiguation)